Bjørn Kristensen (born 10 October 1963) is a Danish former professional footballer and Venstre politician in Aarhus Municipality.

During his active playing career, he most notably played for Danish club AGF and English club Newcastle United. Kristensen also made 20 appearances in which he scored two goals for the Denmark national team, and represented his country at the 1988 European Championship.

Club career
Born in Malling, Kristensen started his career with local top-flight team AGF in 1982. His talent was soon discovered, as he played 12 matches for the Danish under-21 national team from 1983 to 1986. While at AGF, Kristensen won the 1986 Danish championship as well as two Danish Cup trophies.

Kristensen joined Newcastle United in March 1989, as a 25-year old, and became a popular figure amongst the fans for his versatility; he could play as a defender or midfielder. He is also remembered by Newcastle fans for having a powerful long-range shot. He was the second Newcastle player to gain caps for the Danish national team after Preben Arentoft, playing two national team matches in 1991. Kristensen was loaned out to Bristol City in November 1992, before permanently leaving Newcastle in February 1993. He moved to Portsmouth before returning to Denmark.

Kristensen joined defending Danish champions AaB in summer 1995. He made fine displays in the central defense of AaB, and took part in club's campaign in the international 1995–96 UEFA Champions League tournament. Despite being an experienced player in a young squad, Kristensen suffered a number of injuries and only played a total of 22 games for AaB. He moved to Aarhus Fremad in January 1997, and helped the club reach promotion to the Danish Superliga before retiring in January 1998.

International career
Kristensen made his national team debut in May 1987, and took part in a single match at the 1988 European Championship. He made 20 total appearances for Denmark, scoring two goals.

Honours
AGF
Danish Football Championship: 1986
Danish Cup: 1986–87, 1987–88

Aarhus Fremad
Second Highest Danish League runner-up: 1996–97

References

External links
Danish national team profile
 AaB profile

1963 births
Living people
Danish men's footballers
Aarhus Gymnastikforening players
Newcastle United F.C. players
AaB Fodbold players
Portsmouth F.C. players
Bristol City F.C. players
Aarhus Fremad players
Denmark international footballers
Denmark under-21 international footballers
UEFA Euro 1988 players
Association football defenders
People from Aarhus Municipality
Sportspeople from the Central Denmark Region